

TortoiseGit is a Git revision control client, implemented as a Windows shell extension and based on TortoiseSVN. It is free software released under the GNU General Public License.

In Windows Explorer, besides showing context menu items for Git commands, TortoiseGit provides icon overlays that indicate the status of Git working trees and files.

It also comes with the TortoiseGitMerge utility to visually compare two files and resolve conflicts.

See also 
 TortoiseCVS, a Concurrent Versions System client for the Microsoft Windows platform
 TortoiseSVN, a Subversion client for the Microsoft Windows platform
 TortoiseHg, a Mercurial client that can also be used as a client to a Git server
 TortoiseBzr, a similar tool for use with Bazaar

References

External links 
 

Windows-only free software
Free software programmed in C++
Git (software)
Version control GUI tools